Adam Brocklebank (born 6 September 1995) is an English rugby union player for Newcastle Falcons in Premiership Rugby. His preferred position is as a Prop.

Club career
Brocklebank was a late-comer to rugby, first showing interest into the sport at the age of 16. initially a back row, Brocklebank played his first games for Ormskirk Rugby Club and Myerscough College. After beginning his studies at Durham University, Brocklebank was spotted by Newcastle Falcons and represented the club's A-League team in 2014/15 before signing with the Falcons' senior academy the following summer. He was awarded a senior contract in February 2017, to begin the following season after the end of his degree.

In his new role as a prop, Brocklebank has represented both England Counties U18s and England Students. He made his first team debut during the 2016-2017 season.

References

External links
Newcastle Falcons Profile

1995 births
Living people
Alumni of Collingwood College, Durham
Durham University RFC players
English rugby union players
Newcastle Falcons players
Rugby union players from Ormskirk
Rugby union props